Magnetic propulsion may refer to:
Magnetic sail, a proposed method of spacecraft propulsion which would use a magnetic field to deflect solar wind
Linear synchronous motor, a linear motor that uses synchronized electromagnetic pulses to propel a magnetic "rotor"
Linear induction motor, a linear motor that uses a linearly moving magnetic field acting on conductors within the field to produce force
Railgun, an electrically powered electromagnetic projectile launcher
Maglev,  a transport method that uses magnetic levitation to move vehicles without touching the ground